Espoon Honka, also known as Honka Playboys, was a basketball club based in Espoo, Finland and it played in Korisliiga. The club was dissolved in 2011 due to financial difficulties.

History
Espoon Honka was founded in 1975 as a professional team apart from Tapiolan Honka, which worked as a feeder team and took responsibility for organizing youth teams and other activities. Espoon Honka played 16 seasons in the Korisliiga and won seven championship titles.

Espoon Honka didn't play in the 2011–12 season of Korisliiga due to financial problems and the whole team was then dissolved later that year. A new team was then founded under the name Tapiolan Honka.

Honours
 Korisliiga
Winners (7): 1974, 1976, 2001, 2002, 2003, 2007, 2008
Finnish Cup
Winners (5): 1973, 1974, 1975, 2001, 2009

Notable players

Head coaches 
 Gordon Herbert
 Mihailo Pavićević

References

External links
 Espoon Honka in Korisliiga
 Espoon Honka in EuroBasket

Basketball teams in Finland
Basketball teams established in 1957
Sport in Espoo